The first series of Bad Girls premiered on ITV1 on 1 June 1999, and ended on 3 August 1999. It consists of ten episodes. The show was produced by Shed Productions as part of Shed Media. After the first episode aired, the show became an instant hit in the United Kingdom. The show also became successful in several countries including the United States, Australia and Republic of Ireland.

The first series focuses on the growing relationship between new G-Wing governor Helen Stewart and prisoner Nikki Wade. Helen tries to show the prisoners that she on their side by taking matters such as miscarriage, bullying and drugs seriously, whereas the other officers, like Sylvia Hollamby, don't take any interest in the prisoners' problems. Helen doesn't get the support she needs from her officers and tries to convince Nikki that she needs her help in running an orderly wing. This is when Nikki's attraction for Helen begins to grow. Other major storylines in the first series is top dog, Shell Dockley's bullying against new prisoner Rachel Hicks, her drug dealing and her affair with senior officer Jim Fenner who also begins an affair with Rachel, as three become involved in a love triangle, Shell and her sidekick Denny Blood torture Rachel to the point where she commits suicide. New prisoner Zandra Plackett struggles to kick her drug habit, and things get worse when she discovers she's pregnant. Monica Lindsey, another new prisoner on G-Wing, finds it hard to cope when she worries about how her son, Spencer, who has Down's syndrome, will deal with his mother's wrongful imprisonment.

Cast

Main
 Simone Lahbib as G-Wing Governor Helen Stewart
 Mandana Jones as Nicola "Nikki" Wade
 Debra Stephenson as Michelle "Shell" Dockley
 Jack Ellis as James "Jim" Fenner
 Alicya Eyo as Daniella "Denny" Blood
 Luisa Bradshaw-White as Lorna Rose
 Joe Shaw as Dominic McAllister
 Lara Cazalet as Zandra Plackett
 Jane Lowe as Monica Lindsay
 Sharon Duncan Brewster as Crystal Gordon
 Helen Fraser as Sylvia Hollamby
 Victoria Alcock as Julie Saunders
 Kika Mirylees as Julie Johnston
 Joanne Froggatt as Rachel Hicks

Recurring
Oliver Fox as Sean Parr
Roland Oliver as Simon Stubberfield
Eugene Walker as Officer Blakeson
Timmy Lang as Spencer Lindsay
Gideon Turner as Robin Dunstan
Denise Black as Jessie Devlin
Victoria Pritchard as Trisha
 Linda Henry as Yvonne Atkins

Guest
Ashley Miller as Carol Byatt
Penny Ryder as Nellie Snape
Shelley Longworth as Ms Wall
Susan Aderin as Ms Carter
Pauline Whitaker as Nun
Daryl Fisher as Mrs Hicks
Vinny Dhillon as Clinic Nurse
Sheila Ruskin as Mrs Dunstan
David Case as Chaplain
Jean Ainslie as Sister Jill
Ian Flintoff as Vicar
Jane Galloway as Mary
Andrew Frame as Officer Donegan
Alistair Stewart as Newsreader/Himself

Episodes

Reception

Ratings

Release

In the UK, series one was originally released in VHS format in three volumes.  The DVD was released in the UK on 18 June 2001.  It was re-released in the UK on 7 February 2011 by Acorn Media UK, with brand new packaging.  The re-release was also released in a boxset along with series two on 7 February 2011. Series one was also released as part of a series one-four boxset on 9 October 2006.

In Australia, series one has been released three times on DVD, the first being on 24 March 2003 containing the same packaging as the first UK DVD release.  The second release was part of the complete boxset consisting of all eight series which was released on 10 November 2010. The third was released on 12 January 2011, as a separate edition from the complete boxset.

The DVD was released in America on 7 June 2011 containing its own style of cover packaging.  It was released as "The Complete First Season", and was the only series of Bad Girls to be released in America.

Note: Special features marked * are not available on the re-release DVD

References

External links

List of Bad Girls episodes at Epguides

1999 British television seasons
01